In Latvian mythology, the term ' stands for "mother", sometimes written in English as Mhte'''. It was an epithet applied to some sixty-seventy goddesses.  were clearly distinct goddesses in most or all cases, so the term definitely referred to the mother-goddess of specific phenomena. According to professor Lotte Motz, scholar Haralds Biezais mentioned there were at least 70 characters in Baltic religion identified with the title of Mate.

 Overview 

Latvian ethnographer Pēteris Šmits noted that the Mahtes seem to be a phenomenon exclusive to Latvian mythology, with no equivalent either in its Baltic neighbours (Prussian and Lithuanian), nor in other Indo-European mythologies.

According to Miriam Robbins Dexter, these deities were called upon with the epithet "mate" 'mother' and were "goddesses or spirits responsible for the forests, for the fields, for milk, for the sea, for cattle". Similarly, David Adams Leeming remarked that these goddesses "represent[ed] various aspects of nature—fields, mushrooms, elks, and so forth".

According to scholar Elza Kokare, the authenticity of some Mahte deities is dubious, but some are firmly established due to a great number of mentions in the dainas (Latvian folksongs).

 List of Mahte 

Following are some of the Mate characters:

Bangu māte - Mother of Waves
Ceļa māte - Mother of Roads
Dārza māte - Mother of Gardens
Dēkla māte
Gausu māte
Jūras māte - considered a goddess of the sea (from Jura 'sea')
Kapu māte - 'Mother of Graves'
Kārta māte
Krūmu māte - Mother of Bushes
Lapu māte - Mother of Leaves
Lauka māte or Lauku māte - Mother of Fields
Lazdu māte - Mother of the Hazelbush
Lietus māte - Mother Rain
Linu māte - Mother Flax
Lopu māte - Mother of Livestock (Cattle)
Mieža māte - Mother of Barley
Meža māte - Mother of the Forest
Miglas māte - Mother of Fog
Pirts māte - Mother of the Bathhouse
Rijas māte - Mother of the Threshing Place
Sēņu māte - Mother of Mushrooms
Smilšu māte - Mother of Sands
Sniega māte - Mother of Snow
Tirgus māte - Mother of Markets
Ūdens māte - Mother of Waters
Uguns mate - Mother of Fire
Upes māte - Mother of Rivers
Vēja māte - 'Mother of Winds'
Veļu māte or Vélių motę - mother of the souls/spirits
Zemes māte - Earth Mother (Māra)
Ziedu māte - Mother of Flowers

Role of the Mothers
Scholarship on Baltic and Latvian folklore remarks that some of the Mahte characters comprise a complex of deities related to that phenomenon. It is also remarked that, out of this mother cult, "the main
Latvian mother deities are those of the dead, the sea, the forest, and the wind".

Death and the afterlife
For instance, goddess Zemes Mate ('earth mother') was associated with receiving the dead and acting as their ruler and guardian. In Latvian dainas, Zemes Mate is associated with fellow Mahte ("Mothers") Velu Mate ('Mother of Dead Souls') and Kari Mate ('Mother of Graves'). According to researcher Elza Kokare, Zemes Mate and Kari Mate act as the resting places of the dead, guarding its body and holding the key to their graves. As an individual character, Zemes mate is invoked as a person's final resting place.

A second personage is named Veļu māte or Vélių motę (Mother of the souls/spirits of the deceased), etymologically connected to Lithuanian veles 'shades of the dead', velionis 'dead person' and Latvian Vels 'god of the underworld' (as mentioned by scholar Marija Gimbutas) and, by extension, with some relation to Slavic Veles, deity of the underworld. She is considered to be a chthonic goddess and "queen of the dead", who welcomes them at the cemetery.Lurker, Manfred (2004). The Routledge dictionary of gods and goddesses, devils and demons. Routledge. p. 197. .

Another figure named Nāves māte ("Mother Death") was presumed by scholar Nikolai Mikhailov to be connected to Slovenian word navje, an etymon related to the Nav of Slavic folklore, a designation for the dead. He also cited the possibility that Naves mate is another name for Latvian Velu mate and Lithuanian Veliona. The word nāve also means 'death' in Latvian.

Other deities connected with the worship of the dead were Kapu māte ('Mother of Graves', 'Mother of the Grave' or 'Graveyard-Mother') and Smilšu māte ('Mother of Sand' or 'Mother of the Sand Hillock').

The natural world
Another set of Mahte figures relate to the natural world, such as Veju Mate ("The Mother of Winds"); Meža mate ("Mother of the Forest"; counterpart to Lithuanian Medeina), protectress of wild life; Miglas mate ("Mother of the Fog") and Lietus mate ("Mother of Rain"). Veju Mate (or Veja mate) is said to be the goddess of winds and ruler of the weather.

 Bodies of water 
Another group is composed of several water divinities: Juras Mate ("Mother Ocean", "Mother of the Seas" or "Sea-Mother"), a goddess of waters; Udens Mate ("Mother of Waters"); Upes Mahte ("Mother of Rivers"), Bangu Mate ("Mother of Waves"; counterpart to Lithuanian Bangputys). Juras Mate is said to rule the seas as a goddess.Dixon-Kennedy, Mike (1998). Encyclopedia of Russian and Slavic Myth and Legend. Santa Barbara, California: ABC-CLIO. p. 141. .

Deity Bangu mate is considered to be a recent and more poetical appellation of the Mother of the Water and Mother of the Sea.

Household and home
Lithuanian scholar Marija Gimbutas pointed out that Latvian traditions contain a Uguns mate ('Mother of the Fire') as a counterpart to Lithuanian Gabija, a deity of the hearth and protectress of house and family. Other deities associated with the household and domestic affairs are Mãjas gars ("Spirits of the House") and Pirts mate ("Mother of the Bathhouse").

Agriculture
Mahte deities related to fields and agriculture include Lauka mate ("Mother of the Plough-Land"), a deity said to be worshipped at ploughing time.

Footnotes

References

Further reading
 Beldavs, Aija Veldre. "GODDESSES IN A MAN'S WORLD: LATVIAN MATRICENTRICITY IN CULTURE AND SPHERES OF INFLUENCE IN SOCIETY". In: Journal of Baltic Studies'' 8, no. 2 (1977): 105–29. Accessed April 21, 2021. http://www.jstor.org/stable/43210827.

 

de:Mātes